Artists Cannibals Poets Thieves was Six by Seven's fifth and final studio album before they disbanded and the third on their own Saturday Night Sunday Morning Records label, however, one more "unofficial album" had a limited release in January 2006: Club Sandwich at the Peveril Hotel.

Track listing
 "All I Really Want from You Is Love" - 4:30
 "Nowhere to Go But Home" - 5:51
 "In My Time (We Don't Belong)" - 3:15
 "Tonight (I Wanna Make It Out)" - 5:56
 "(I Gotta) Get It Together Again" - 4:24
 "Stara Paris Rescued Me" - 6:24
 "Just Get It Down" - 2:28
 "Let's Throw Some Mud at the Wall" - 2:44
 "You Know I Feel Alright Now" - 4:32

References

Six by Seven albums
2005 albums